The St. Dominic's Church in Denver, Colorado, is a historic church at 3005 W. 29th Avenue.  It was built during 1923 to 1926 and added to the National Register of Historic Places in 1996.

Described as Late Gothic Revival in style overall, it is said to exhibit "characteristics of the middle to late Ravonnant and Flamboyant styles." It has a Latin Cross plan. It has a rose window in a tall parapeted gable.

References

External links

Roman Catholic churches in Denver
Gothic Revival church buildings in Colorado
Late Gothic Revival architecture
National Register of Historic Places in Denver
Churches on the National Register of Historic Places in Colorado
Roman Catholic churches completed in 1926
20th-century Roman Catholic church buildings in the United States